Parpi is a village in the Ashtarak Municipality of the Aragatsotn Province of Armenia. It is home to the 5th-century Tsiranavor Church, with 7th- and 10th-century modifications. There is also S. Grigor or S. Grigor Lusavorich (Gregory the Illuminator) Church and the 7th-century (rebuilt 10th-11th century) Targmanchats (Holy Translator) Church located in a medieval-modern cemetery on a hill to the east. Nearby is a cave with a working door, used as a place of refuge between the 16th and 18th centuries.

History 
The 5th- to 6th-century Armenian chronicler and historian Ghazar Parpetsi was born at Parpi in AD 442. He is recognized for writing History of Armenia, sometime in the early 6th century. Parpi is known to have had a brief visit during October 1734 by Abraham Kretatsi during the time while he was serving the Catholicos Abraham II. He wrote:

The village is also mentioned in a 13th-century inscription on the southern wall of the Katoghike Church of the Astvatsnkal Monastery built between the 5th and 13th centuries in the village of Hartavan. It reads as follows:

Gallery

See also 
Aragatsotn Province

References 

 
 World Gazetteer: Armenia – World-Gazetteer.com
 Report of the results of the 2001 Armenian Census

Bibliography 
 Kiesling, Rediscovering Armenia, pp. 15, available online at the US embassy to Armenia's website

External links 

Populated places in Aragatsotn Province